Mark James Crear (born October 2, 1968) is a double Olympic medalist in the 110 m hurdles from the United States. In 1996 he was second behind Allen Johnson. Four years later he came in third behind Anier Garcia and silver medalist Terrence Trammell. Mark's personal best was 12.98 seconds.

Crear went to Rowland High School, in the Rowland Heights area of southern California, where he finished second in the 300 meters hurdles and fourth in the 110 meters hurdles at the 1987 CIF California State Meet.  He then went to the University of Southern California, where he won the 1992 National Championship in the 110 meters hurdles.  He still holds the USC school record in the hurdles.

Mark Crear has been around the world presenting motivational keynotes and peak performance workshops to various corporations and organizations at all levels across a variety of industries. This USC alumnus has over 15 years of Olympic level peak performance success, who first captured attention by winning the 1996 Olympic Silver Medal with a broken arm and the 2000 Olympic Bronze Medal with a double hernia (110M High Hurdles Track & Field).

After winning the silver medal in 1996, Crear carried his infant daughter Ebony in his victory lap around the Olympic Stadium.  Ebony ran for Maranatha High School and later Long Beach Poly, making the finals of the CIF California State Meet in the 100 meters hurdles once for each school and anchoring Poly to the 2014 state championship in the 4x400 meters relay before moving on to Texas A&M University.

Personal bests

Achievements

References

External links 
 
 Newsmaker of the Week: Mark Crear (30 min.)
 

1968 births
Living people
Athletes (track and field) at the 2000 Summer Olympics
Athletes (track and field) at the 1996 Summer Olympics
American male hurdlers
African-American male track and field athletes
Olympic silver medalists for the United States in track and field
Olympic bronze medalists for the United States in track and field
University of Southern California alumni
Track and field athletes from San Francisco
Medalists at the 2000 Summer Olympics
Medalists at the 1996 Summer Olympics
Goodwill Games medalists in athletics
Competitors at the 1998 Goodwill Games
Competitors at the 1994 Goodwill Games
Competitors at the 2001 Goodwill Games
21st-century African-American people
20th-century African-American sportspeople